Deodat  or Déodat is a masculine given name. In the French language, it means "God has given", in similar usage to Dieudonné, Matthew, Theodore, Jonathan, and Nathaniel.

The name is also found among South Asian communities and their diaspora.

Notable people
Déodat Gratet de Dolomieu, (1750– 1801), French geologist
Deodat Lawson, (fl. 1684–1688), British colonial minister
Deodat del Monte, (1582–1644), Flemish  painter, architect, engineer, astronomer, and art dealer
Déodat de Séverac, (1872–1921), French composer
Deodatus of Nevers (d. 679), bishop of Nevers

See also
 Deodato (disambiguation), a similar name

French given names